Mount Hayward is a hill  southwest of Mount Heine on White Island, in the Ross Archipelago, Antarctica. It was named by the New Zealand Geological Survey Antarctic Expedition (1958–59) for Victor Hayward, a British member of Ernest Shackleton's Imperial Trans-Antarctic Expedition (1914–17), who lost his life in a blizzard on 8 May 1916 on the sea ice in McMurdo Sound.

References

Mountains of the Ross Dependency
White Island (Ross Archipelago)